Émile Reuse (7 November 1883 – 6 June 1975) was a Belgian footballer. He played in two matches for the Belgium national football team from 1907 to 1910.

References

External links
 

1883 births
1975 deaths
Belgian footballers
Belgium international footballers
Place of birth missing
Association football midfielders